Gheorghe Lupu (24 February 1884 – 30 April 1966) was a Romanian tennis player. He competed in the men's singles and doubles events at the 1924 Summer Olympics.

References

External links
 

1884 births
1966 deaths
Romanian male tennis players
Olympic tennis players of Romania
Tennis players at the 1924 Summer Olympics
Sportspeople from Vaslui